The Rhymney line is a commuter rail line running from Cardiff Central through the Rhymney valley via Heath and Llanishen in the north of the city, to Caerphilly, Bargoed and Rhymney.

History
The name comes from the fact that the original line was part of the Rhymney Railway's system.

The line is currently operated by Transport for Wales Rail Services as part of the Valley Lines network. TfW replaced the previous franchise, Arriva Trains Wales in October 2018.

In March 2007 the latest in a series of infrastructure improvements on the Valley Lines was announced, which included lengthening of platforms between Rhymney and Penarth to allow Class 150 units to operate in multiples of 3 (6 cars). However, this is postponed indefinitely due to the sub-lease by the Department for Transport, to Great Western Railway, of the units that would have allowed this extra capacity.

Service
The line currently has a 15-minute daytime headway between Bargoed and Cardiff, with most journeys terminating at Penarth. Prior to re-signalling early in 2006, a 20-minute headway was operated. North of Bargoed, one train per hour runs over the single track to Rhymney. The Sunday service operates over the entire length of the line every 2 hours, though this now runs all the day since Dec 2005.

Rolling stock

Some peak hour and Saturday services were formed of one Class 37/4 locomotive and four Mk. 2F carriages. Two locomotives received special heritage repaints into 1960s BR Green livery (no. 37411) or 1980s BR Blue Large Logo livery (no. 37425) to mark the end of locomotive-hauled trains.    Two Class 37s (nos. 37425 and 37408) were involved in a runaway situation and collided at Rhymney Sidings on 30 July 2005. Number 37408 was withdrawn, and replaced by previously stored no. 37419. Number 37425 was repaired, but whilst it was out of traffic, Class 47 locomotives were hired from Riviera Trains as cover. Class 37-hauled trains  finished on 10 December 2005, however in the new year Arriva received complaints from commuters about comfort and over-crowding, so reinstated a Monday to Friday diagram, operating a morning train into Cardiff, and an evening train back to Rhymney, usually using 37410. With the December 2006 timetable change this service reverted to DMU, and with Arriva Trains Wales said to be disposing of its loco hauled stock, it would appear as though the end of loco haulage on the line has finally come. Class 37 services operated between June 2019 and March 2020 after being withdrawn due to reliability issues. For these service 37421 in Colas Rail livery was used and 37418 and 37025 (as a thunderbird loco) both in BR Large Logo liveries these were leased from Colas Rail.

Electrification of the line
On 16 July 2012 plans to electrify the line were announced by the UK Government. The announcement was made as an extension of the electrification of the South Wales Main Line from Cardiff to Swansea and the electrification of the south Wales Valley Lines at a total cost of £350 million. The investment will require new trains and should result in reduced journeys times and a cheaper to maintain network.

Work was expected to start between 2014 and 2019, but was then pushed back to between 2019 and 2024. Preliminary re-signalling work on the route, which will see the remaining manual signal boxes at Heath, Ystrad Mynach and Bargoed abolished in favour of remote control from the new Cardiff Rail Operating Centre, was completed in early September 2013.

However, as part of Welsh Government's South Wales Metro this line has been taken over, and will soon be electrified in preparation for new Class 756 rolling stock.

See also
List of railway stations in Cardiff

References 

Railway lines in Wales
Standard gauge railways in Wales
Transport in Caerphilly
Transport in Caerphilly County Borough
Rail transport in Cardiff